Liu Hao (born 15 January 1996) is a Chinese footballer who currently plays for Suzhou Dongwu.

Club career
Liu Hao joined Hangzhou Greentown's youth academy in 2008. He transferred to Chinese Super League side Guangzhou Evergrande in January 2015. 

Liu started his professional football career in June 2016 when he was loaned to China League One side Guizhou Zhicheng for six months. He made his debut for Guizhou on 3 July 2016 in a 1–0 away win against Meizhou Hakka, coming on as a substitute for Wang Fan in the 57th minute. On 31 July 2016, he scored his first senior goal in his fourth appearance for Guizhou, which ensured Guizhou's 2–0 win against Beijing Enterprises Group. Liu made ten appearances in the second half of 2016 season as Guizhou finished the runners-up of the league and won promotion to the first tier. On 24 February 2017, Guizhou Hengfeng Zhicheng extended Liu's loan deal for one season. He made his Super League debut on 22 April 2017 in a 2–0 home defeat against Shanghai Shenhua. Liu made a permanent transfer to Guizhou Hengfeng on 28 February 2018 with a three-year contract. On 20 October 2018, he scored his first Super League goal in a 3–0 home win over Dalian Yifang.

On 1 March 2019, Liu transferred to hometown club Sichuan Longfor who newly promoted to China League One.

Career statistics
.

References

External links
 

1996 births
Living people
Chinese footballers
China youth international footballers
Footballers from Sichuan
Sportspeople from Chengdu
Association football defenders
Chinese Super League players
China League One players
Guangzhou F.C. players
Guizhou F.C. players
Sichuan Longfor F.C. players